The 2007–08 Hong Kong FA Cup was the 34th staging of the Hong Kong FA Cup. Citizen beat Wofoo Tai Po by 2-0 in the final and captured the FA Cup for the first time.

The competition started on 23 April 2008 with 10 Hong Kong First Division clubs. Four of them took part in the first round to determine which team advanced to the quarter finals. From quarter finals onward, the cup competition was a single-elimination tournament.

The competition was officially known as 2007/2008 HKFA Lanwa International FA Cup due to sponsorship from LANWA Group Company Limited 

Although all the matches before the final was held at the Mongkok Stadium, the final was staged at the Hong Kong Stadium on 18 May 2008. The final match was part of the fund raising charity activities for the 2008 Sichuan earthquake. All profits of the game was donated for the rescue and rebuild of Sichuan after the basic costs are deducted. Four matches was played in total, including three friendly matches and the FA Cup final. The friendly matches include 1) SCAA Veteran vs Happy Valley Veteran, 2) HKFA Invitation Team vs All Star Sport Association and 3) TVB Artist vs Ladies Star Team.

Teams
Bulova Rangers
Citizen
Convoy Sun Hei
Eastern
Happy Valley
Kitchee
Lanwa Redbull
South China
Wofoo Tai Po
Workable

Fixtures and results
All times are Hong Kong Time (UTC+8).

Bracket

First round

Quarter-finals

Semi-finals

Final

Top goalscorers
 2 goals
  Giovane (Convoy Sun Hei)
  Chen Zhizhao (Citizen)

 1 goal
  Akosah (Kitchee)
  Rodrigo (Eastern)
  Chan Wai Ho (South China)
  Rafael (Wofoo Tai Po)
  Itaparica (South China)
  Márcio (Citizen)
  Tomy (Happy Valley)
  Lee Wai Lim (Wofoo Tai Po)
  Jeferson (Eastern)
  Paulo (Eastern)
  Joel (Wofoo Tai Po)
  Ye Jia (Wofoo Tai Po)

Prizes

Team awards
 Champion (HK$80,000): Citizen
 1st Runners-up (HK$20,000): Wofoo Tai Po
 Knock-out in the Semi-Finals (2 teams) (HK$10,000 each): Eastern, South China
 Knock-out in the Preliminary (6 teams) (HK$5,000 each): Bulova Rangers, Convoy Sun Hei, Happy Valley, Kitchee, Lanwa Redbull, Workable

Individual awards
 Top Scorer Award (HK$5,000 shared):  Giovane (Convoy Sun Hei),  Chen Zhizhao (Citizen)
 Best Defender Award (HK$5,000):  Festus Baise (Citizen)

Trivia
 It was the first time since 1991-92 season that the FA Cup final was competed by two teams which had never reached this cup final before. 
 Both Citizen and Wofoo Tai Po had never captured any senior trophies in their club histories.

See also
The Hong Kong Football Association

References

External links

Hong Kong FA Cup
FA
2008 domestic association football cups